Malarian pelko is the debut solo studio album by Finnish rapper Paperi T, released on 17 April 2015. The album peaked at number one on the Finnish Albums Chart in April 2015.

Track listing

Charts

Release history

See also
List of number-one albums of 2015 (Finland)

References

2015 debut albums